Rising Tide is a fantasy novel by Mel Odom, set in the world of the Forgotten Realms, and based on the Dungeons & Dragons role-playing game. It is the first novel in "The Threat from the Sea" trilogy. It was published in paperback in January 1999.

Plot summary
Four adventurers – Jherek, Laaqueel, Iakhovas, and Pacys – sail the oceans as each are pulled toward the city of Baldur's Gate.

Reception
A reviewer from Publishers Weekly comments: "Odom does an admirable job of bringing the sea setting and its varied species to life. The novel's detailed fight sequences are tightly packed, making for a fast, exciting read, but Odom leaves its resolution for the next installment of his four-book series."

References

1999 American novels
Forgotten Realms novels